Ihab El-Masry (born 22 October 1985) is an Egyptian football striker who plays for Egyptian Premier League side Smouha Sporting Club.

El-Masry scored a brace for the Contractors during the penultimate round of the 2008–09 season. Ehab played for several Egyptian football clubs, and in July 2017, he signed a 3-year contract for Raja CA in a free transfer. He canceled the contract few days later.

International career
Ihab was called into the provisional Egypt national football team for the 2009 FIFA Confederations Cup in South Africa, but he failed to secure his place in final team.

References

External links
Ehab El Masry at KOOORA.com

1985 births
Al Masry SC players
Al Mokawloon Al Arab SC players
Association football forwards
Aswan SC players
Egyptian footballers
Egypt international footballers
Haras El Hodoud SC players
Living people
Petrojet SC players
El Raja SC players
Smouha SC players